Karl Joseph Maria Drerup (1904 – 2000) was a leading figure in the mid-twentieth-century American enamels field. Trained as a painter, Drerup taught himself to enamel in the early 1940s, fusing glass to metal through a high-temperature firing process. Through his inventive, "painterly" approach to the medium, he advanced enameling to new levels of beauty, power, and expressiveness. Drerup's love of nature is apparent in every detail of his intimate woodland scenes, just as his depictions of humble workers in natural settings reveal his profound respect for humanity. A modest, self-deprecating individual, he exerted an enormous impact on the generation of enamel artists that emerged in the United States in the period immediately following World War II.

Early life and training

Born in 1904 in Borghorst, Westphalia, in the northwest region of Germany, Karl Drerup was raised in an affluent Roman Catholic household. In 1918 he and his brother were sent to a Cistercian monastery school. In 1921 Drerup decided to pursue a career in art and, in spite of his family's objections, he attended the Kunstgewerbeschule in Münster, where he studied painting and drawing. He later received more advanced training in printmaking and the graphic arts from Hans Meid and Karl Michel at the Vereinigte Staatsschulen, Berlin, from 1927 to 1929. It was in Berlin that Drerup first saw the work of the enamel artist Hanns Bastanier.

In 1930 Drerup moved to Florence to continue his studies with the Italian painter Felice Carena at the Accademia di Belle Arti from 1930 to 1933. In 1932 he met Gertrude Lifmann, a fellow student who was pursuing studies in linguistics. She later became his wife. While in Florence, Drerup began to experiment with clay, learning various techniques from artisans working in the numerous Florentine ceramic shops and studios.

In 1934 he married and moved to Madrid. Because his wife was Jewish and anti-Semitic fervor was increasing in Europe, the Drerups moved to Puerto de la Cruz, Tenerife, in the Canary Islands, off the northwest coast of Africa. Between 1934 and 1937 Drerup painted while his wife worked as a translator. The paintings and drawings he made in Tenerife frequently depict the seemingly untroubled lives of the islanders, working in the fields by day and fishing at night. Colorful images from this idyllic period in Drerup's life recur throughout his work.

During this immensely productive period, Drerup developed a strong international reputation. His paintings were regularly shown in exhibitions in Europe, including presentations at the Landesmuseum Münster (1931) and with the Vereinigung Westfälischer Künstler und Kunstfreunde in Dortmund (1932). Also in 1932 his work was shown in New York in an exhibition of the Deutscher Künstlerbund at the Nicholas Roerich Museum. While at this point in his career Drerup was best known as a painter, his ceramics were also shown in the Westfälischer Kunstverein exhibition organized in 1934 by the Landesmuseum Münster.

Move to the United States

In 1937, with political turmoil increasing throughout Europe, the Drerups moved to the United States, settling in Rockville Centre, a small community on Long Island, east of New York City. They lived and worked there until 1945.

Drerup later recalled that in 1937, while visiting the Whitney Museum of American Art, he saw and was impressed by the enamels of Edward Winter, particularly Winter's large enamel panels, executed at a scale unprecedented in the history of enameling. A chance encounter with the designer Tommi Parzinger at the Rena Rosenthal Gallery led to a friendship between the two artists as Parzinger encouraged Drerup to explore enameling. By 1940 Drerup was exhibiting his enamels in the National Ceramic Exhibition at the Syracuse Museum of Fine Arts (now the Everson Museum of Art), where he won his first honorable mention.

The following year, Drerup submitted to the National Ceramic Exhibition his most ambitious work to date, a mural-scale composition titled Enchanted Garden. Using six-by-six-inch copper panels, he enameled each of the eighteen plaques with a fantasy-inspired landscape depicting a variety of flora and fauna, beloved images from nature. This work is now in the collection of the Smithsonian American Art Museum.
		
In the early 1940s, Drerup taught art at Adelphi College on Long Island and quickly rose to prominence in the enamels field. Several solo exhibitions were organized and circulated between 1941 and 1944. He also participated in a number of juried shows. In 1941 an exhibition comprising more than fifty of Drerup's earliest enamel plaques, plates, bowls, boxes, and other objects was organized by the Arts and Crafts Club of New Orleans and traveled to eight institutions on the West Coast through 1943.

In 1945 at the urging of David Campbell, the President of the League of New Hampshire Craftsmen, and ceramists Edwin and Mary Scheier, the Drerups moved to New Hampshire. Settling in Thornton, an idyllic, somewhat remote town in central New Hampshire, Drerup was ideally situated to observe his wooded surroundings and to record the flora and fauna he so dearly loved. Plaque (Pond Life) of c. 1957 (in the collection of the Enamel Arts Foundation, Los Angeles) reveals his fascination with the natural world.
In 1946 Drerup became a member of the League of New Hampshire Craftsmen. Also in 1946, he was invited to teach an enamel workshop at Plymouth State College near his home, and in 1948 he was appointed to the newly created post of professor of fine arts.  He taught there until his retirement in 1968 when the college named its art gallery in his honor and also granted him an honorary doctorate.

Throughout his career, Drerup produced numerous variants on several favorite subjects and themes. Among these were images depicting Saint George, Saint Eustace, and Saint Hubert. Given the strict religious training in his youth, it is not surprising that Drerup chose to depict these stories.

Although Drerup produced both grisaille and cloisonné enamels, he is best known for his painterly approach to enameling and for his meticulous attention to detail. In 1957 the newly formed Museum of Contemporary Crafts in New York awarded one of its first solo exhibitions to Drerup. For the museum's seminal 1959 exhibition "Enamels", he was invited, along with Kenneth F. Bates and Edward Winter, to have a mini retrospective within the context of the whole show, which presented historical enamels as well as the work of contemporary practitioners.

Honors and awards

Drerup received numerous honors and awards throughout his life. He was elected a master craftsman of the Society of Arts and Crafts, Boston, in 1950. In 1989 he was the recipient of the New Hampshire Living Treasure Award, and in 1995 he became a fellow of the American Craft Council. Yet throughout his life he remained humble. In a letter to a collector of his work, Drerup wrote, "I appreciate to know when someone can derive joy from the long hours which I spend in making these little dreams out of glass and metal."

Selected works

(Add images and captions here)

References

 Jazzar, Bernard N. and Harold B. Nelson. Little Dreams in Glass and Metal: Enameling in America, 1920 to the Present. Los Angeles, California: Enamel Arts Foundation and University of North Carolina Press, 2015, 208 - 212.

External links
 www.karldrerup.com
 Enamelarts
 

American artists
American enamelers
German enamellers
20th-century enamellers
1904 births
2000 deaths
People from Thornton, New Hampshire
20th-century ceramists
German emigrants to the United States